Taqiabad (also Romanized as Taqīābād and Taghīābād; also known as Taqīābād-e Shādān) is a village in Qaleh Zari Rural District, Jolgeh-e Mazhan District, Khusf County, South Khorasan Province, Iran. At the 2006 census, its population was 77, in 21 families.

References 

Populated places in Khusf County